Thornfield is an unincorporated community in Ozark County, Missouri, United States. Thornfield has a post office with ZIP code 65762.

A post office called Thornfield has been in open since 1878. The area was named for the local Thornfield family.

Thornfield R-1 Elementary School is about one mile east of the town on Route 95.

Thornfield (GNIS FID: 752535) is a populated place located within the Township of Thornfield, a minor civil division (MCD) of Ozark County.

The elevation of Thornfield is 807 feet. Thornfield appears on the Thornfield U.S. Geological Survey Map.

References

Unincorporated communities in Ozark County, Missouri
Unincorporated communities in Missouri